Mount Chalmers is a rural town and locality in the Livingstone Shire, Queensland, Australia.

Geography 
The town of Mount Chalmers is in the north of the locality with Mount Nicholson being a neighbourhood within the south of the locality.

The locality contains the following named peaks:

 Cabbage Tree Hill 
 Mount Chalmers 
 Mount Standish

History 

Gold was found in Mount Chalmers in 1860 but gold mining did not commence in the area until 1869. It was named after Mr Chambers who established a battery. In 1899 copper mining commenced.
Mount Chalmers Provisional School  opened on 23 January 1901. On 1 January 1909 it became Mount Chalmers State School. The school was mothballed on 31 December 2005 and its closure finalised on 31 December 2006. In 2014 the Livingstone Shire Council purchased the site for $230,000 for use by the local community. It is located at 16 School Street.

In 1908 the Yeppoon railway line was established from Sleipners Junction on the North Rockhampton to Emu Park railway line and then through to Yeppoon railway station. Mount Chalmers railway station served the town, and Mount Nicholson railway station served the south of the locality.

In 1911, the census recorded a population of 1,181.

The Sisters of St Joseph of the Sacred Heart opened a Catholic primary school in 1913.

Mining ended in 1914 and people moved away; the 1921 census showed the population had fallen to 95 people.

The Yeppoon railway line ceased passenger services in 1978 and closed completely in 2004.

Education 
There are no schools in Mount Chalmers. The nearest primary school is Cawarral State School in neighbouring Cawaral to the north-east. The nearest government secondary schools are North Rockhampton State High School in Frenchville, Rockhampton, to the south-west and Yeppoon State High School in Yeppoon to the north-east.

Amenities 
The Mount Chalmers Community History Centre operates from the old school site. The old school also has a library run by volunteers and supported by the Livingstone Shire Council.

References

External links

 

Towns in Queensland
Shire of Livingstone
Localities in Queensland